The Pillar of Eliseg – also known as Elise's Pillar or Croes Elisedd in Welsh – stands near Valle Crucis Abbey, Denbighshire, Wales [Grid reference ]. It was erected by Cyngen ap Cadell (died 855), king of Powys in honour of his great-grandfather Elisedd ap Gwylog. The form Eliseg found on the pillar is assumed to be a mistake by the carver of the inscription.

History
Whilst the pillar itself dates to the 9th century, the large artificial mound is thought to be significantly older, possibly prehistoric. Certainly the mound can be dated to the Bronze Age.

Inscription
The Latin inscription consisted of some thirty-one lines of insular script. It not only mentioned several individuals described in the Historia Britonum, but also complemented the information presented in that text. Considerable portions of the original inscription were read by the antiquarian Edward Lluyd in 1696 and his transcript seems to have been remarkably accurate according to Robert Vermaat of Vortigern Studies.

A generally accepted translation of this inscription, one of the longest surviving inscriptions from pre-Viking Wales, is as follows:

The pillar was thrown down by the Roundheads during the English Civil War and a grave under it opened. Edward Lhuyd examined the pillar and copied the inscription in 1696. The lower half disappeared but the upper half was re-erected in 1779. The original inscription is now illegible.

Archaeological examination
Trevor Lloyd, the landowner in 1773, is said to have conducted an examination and found a stone cist burial in which he claimed to have found a skeleton and artefacts, which he removed.

The mound that supports the pillar was subjected to excavation in the years 2010, 2011 and 2012 by Project Eliseg. This established that the earliest phase of construction was that of a kerbed platform cairn, dated by type to around 2000 BC. A small cist in the first phase of construction yielded evidence of burnt human bone, confirming its use as a burial site. The second phase of construction consisted of a raising in height of the cairn and contained a large cist considered as Early Bronze Age; however, no human remains were found. A further cist was found in this phase which contained 7 kg of cremated bone, representing numerous adult, juvenile and infant burials. A flint knife and a bone pin were also recovered. The final phase of construction appeared to be relatively modern and probably subsequent to the re-erection of the cross.

See also
Magnus Maximus
Gratian
King Doniert's Stone – contemporary Cornish cross

External links

 – the pillar and the etymology of "Eliseg" are discussed in this article, which includes Edward Lhuyd's translation.
Project Eliseg – 2010 Archaeological Excavation of the Pillar and Surrounding area
"Ancient British Pillar, Valle Crucis Abbey, North Wales", Table-book

References

Grade I listed buildings in Denbighshire
Grade I listed monuments and memorials in Wales
 Pillar
Monumental columns in Wales
Monuments and memorials in Denbighshire
Outdoor sculptures in Wales
Scheduled monuments in Denbighshire
Welsh literature
9th-century inscriptions